Katharine Price Collier St. George (July 12, 1894 – May 2, 1983) was a Republican member of the United States House of Representatives from New York, and a cousin of President Franklin Delano Roosevelt.

Early life and family

St. George was born in Bridgnorth, England, in 1894, to American parents. Her family returned to the United States when she was two years of age. Her father, Hiram Price Collier, was a former Unitarian minister. Her mother, Catherine Delano Collier, was the younger sister of Sara Delano Roosevelt, mother of President Franklin Delano Roosevelt. St. George's younger sister, Sara Collier, was named in their aunt's honor. From her mother's first marriage to Charles Albert Robbins, she was younger half-sister of diplomat Warren Delano Robbins.

Career
She was a member of the town board of Tuxedo Park, New York, from 1926 until 1949. She was chair of the Orange County Republican committee from 1942 until 1948. She was a delegate to the 1944 Republican National Convention. She was elected to Congress in 1946 and served from January 3, 1947, until January 3, 1965. (Her opponent in the 1956 election was Pulitzer Prize-winning cartoonist Bill Mauldin.)  She narrowly lost a re-election bid in 1964 against liberal Democrat John G. Dow.

A proponent of pay equity, St. George was a supporter of the Equal Pay Act of 1963. In 1962, St. George proposed that legislation be passed to ensure that women received equal pay for equal work. Her proposals were drafted into a bill and introduced by Congresswoman Edith Green, an Oregon Democrat. During a debate regarding the bill, St. George stated that opposing the bill was comparable to "being against motherhood".

The bill met with stiff opposition from the United States Chamber of Commerce, but received support from the Kennedy Administration, the American Association of Women, the National Consumers League, the ACLU, and the AFL-CIO.

The bill passed in both the House and the Senate, but it passed in different forms, and there was no final bill. Undaunted, in 1963, Green re-introduced the bill, and this time it was successfully signed into law.

St. George voted in favor of the Civil Rights Acts of 1957, 1960, and 1964, as well as the 24th Amendment to the U.S. Constitution.

Personal life
Katharine married George Baker Bligh St. George, third son of the second Baronet St. George (see St George Baronets). They were the parents of one daughter:

 Priscilla St. George, who married first to Angier Biddle Duke (1915–1995), an American diplomat, and an heir to the Duke tobacco empire, from 1936 to 1940; and second to State Senator Allan A. Ryan, Jr. (1903–1981) from 1941 to 1950.

St. George and her family resided briefly at 2144 Wyoming Avenue in Washington D.C. before relocating to Tuxedo Park, New York, in June 1919, where she much later died at the age of eighty-eight, in 1983. She was buried in the cemetery of St. Mary's-in-Tuxedo Episcopal Church.

See also

 Women in the United States House of Representatives

References

External links

 

1894 births
1983 deaths
Delano family
Female members of the United States House of Representatives
Women in New York (state) politics
People from Bridgnorth
Republican Party members of the United States House of Representatives from New York (state)
People from Tuxedo, New York
20th-century American politicians
20th-century American women politicians